Thomas A. Winter (born July 10, 1986) is an American politician from the state of Montana. A member of the Democratic Party, he served in the Montana House of Representatives for the 96th district from 2019 to 2021.

Early life 
Winter was raised in Kansas City, Missouri, and moved to Missoula, Montana, in his early 20s to attend the University of Montana.

Career 
Winter defeated Adam Hertz to win election to the Montana House in the 2018 election.

He lost the Democratic Party's nomination to Kathleen Williams.

References

External links
Tom Winter for Congress

1986 births
21st-century American politicians
Candidates in the 2022 United States House of Representatives elections
Living people
Democratic Party members of the Montana House of Representatives
Politicians from Kansas City, Missouri
Politicians from Missoula, Montana